Portage River may refer to the following streams in the U.S. state of Michigan:

 Portage River (Houghton County, Michigan), the southern end of the Keweenaw Waterway
 Portage River (Washtenaw County, Michigan), a tributary of the Huron River
 Portage River (Jackson County, Michigan), a tributary of the Grand River
 Portage River (Kalamazoo/St. Joseph Counties), a tributary of the St. Joseph River (Lake Michigan)

Rivers of Michigan
Set index articles on rivers of Michigan